Gypsonoma haimbachiana, the cottonwood twig borer, is a moth of the family Tortricidae. It is found in eastern North America, from Canada to the Gulf Coast of the United States and west to Missouri.

The wingspan is 13–17 mm. Adults are ash grey. There are four or more generations per year in the southern part of their range.

The larvae feed on Populus sect. Aigeiros and other Populus species. Young larvae cover themselves with silk mixed with trash and then bore into the midrib of their host plant. After some days, they leave the midrib gallery and tunnel into a young shoot to complete their larval development. Full-grown larvae move down the trunk to spin a cocoon in a sheltered bark crevice, in litter or between leaf folds. It is one of the most destructive insects of young cottonwood. Full-grown larvae are pale, with a brown-yellow head. They reach a length of 10–13 mm.

Etymology
The species is named for Frank Haimbach, who collected the first specimens in Cincinnati, Ohio.

Gallery

References

Moths described in 1907
Eucosmini